Nørregade 6 is a Neoclassical property situated at the corner of the streets Nørregade and Dyrkøb, next to the Church of Our Lady, in the Old Town of Copenhagen, Denmark. It was listed in the Danish registry of protected buildings and places in 1918. The ground floor of the building was home to a book shop from 1983 until 2015, most recently since 1979 operating under the name Atheneum. Former residents include the jurist and later politician Wilhelm Sponneck, army officer and politician Anton Frederik Tscherningm, publisher Meïr Aron Goldschmidt and Denmark's first female physician Nielsine Nielsen.

History

18th century

The property was listed as No. 140 in Klædebo Quarter in 1689 and owned by wine merchant Johan Daniel Klein. In the new cadastre of 1756, it was listed as No. 243. It was owned by Lyder Stiefgen at that time.

Brummer family
The property was acquired by Diederich Brummer before 1787. At the time of the 1787 census, No. 250 was home to three households. Diederich Brummer resided in the building with his wife Charlotte Marie Sveistrup, their five children (aged six to 16), his father-in-law Niels Sveistrup and two maids. Niels Møller, an undertaker, resided in the building with his wife Anne Sophie Brakke, their two children (aged five and eight) and two children. Erick Hansen Hiortholm, the manager of Brummer's wax cloth factory, resided in the building with his wife  
Marie Hansdatter and one maid.

Brummer was divorced from his wife by 1801. At that time, he was living in the building with his four children (aged 11 to 26), his former wife's nephew Christian Sveistrup (aged 15) and one maid. In the new cadastre of 1806, the property was listed as No. 250. It was owned by  D. Brummer then.

Peter Jørgen Petersen and the new building
The building was destroyed by fire during the British bombardment in 1807. The fire site was later acquired by tobacco manufacturer Peter Jørgen Petersen. Between 1812 and 1814, he constructed a new single-storey building on the site.

Niels Wolff and his extension
In c. 1826 the property was acquired by the civil serant Niels Wolff. He had until then owned the Ording House at the corner of Vandkunsten and Gåsegade. In 1827 to 1828, he increased the building's height from one to four storeys.

Wolff was married to Emilie Zinn, a member of the wealthy Zinn family, whose mother owned Vodroffsgård.

Børge Thorlacius (1775–1829), a professor of theology, was among the residents of the building from 1822 to 1826 and again from 1829. Wilhelm Sponneck, a jurist who would later serve as Minister of Financial Affairs, resided in the building from 1837. Anton Frederik Tscherning, who had just returned to Denmark from France, resided in one of the apartments from 1839. The author Meïr Aron Goldschmidt was among the residents in 1853–1854.

1860s

At the time of the 1860 census, the property was home to a total of 28 people. Ludvig Heckscher (1813–1882), a lawyer, resided on the first floor with his wife Jette Heckscher (née Michelsen, 1824–1913), their two children (aged three and four), his mother-in-law Frederikke Michelsen and two maids. Jette Heckscher's sister, Helene Hirsch (née Michelsen, 1916–1806), resided on the ground floor with her husband Isach Samuel Hirsch and one maid. Fritz Peter Jensen, a wine merchant, resided on the second floor with his wife Anna Jacobine Albertine Margrethe Jensen (née Westergaard), their three children (aged two to eight) and housekeeper and two maids. Johannes Severin Westergaard, a money counter, resided in the other second floor apartment with his wife Hansine Westergaard (née Jacobsen) and one maid. Sophie Obdrup (née Becker), a 60-year-old widow, resided on the third floor with the 48-year-old school mistress Emma Obdrup, the 42-year-old school teacher Hanne Margrethe Obdrup and one maid. Frederikke Nielsine Josephine Lundberg (née Bøye), a 38-year-old widow, resided in the garret.	 Edvard Julius Munch, a 26-year-old wine merchant, resided in the basement with one maid.

 (Willemoes-Quistgaard's School Pension) was located in the building in the 1860s. Nielsine Nielsen, who would later become Denmark's first female physician, resided there in 1873–1874 in return for teaching in the lower classes.The photographer W.A. Walter's photographic studio was located in the building from 1973 to 1970.

The book shop, 18742015
On 1 January 1984, M.P. Madsen (1843–1895) opened a vintage book shop in the building. In 1882, it was converted into a regular book shop. On Madsen's death in 1895, it was continued by his widow with G. Torst (1847–1914) as manager.

On 15 August 1916, A. Rechtwig (1865–) and P.A. Munksgaard (1893–) acquired the book shop. In 1924, it was taken over by Levin & Munksgaard, a combined book shop and publishing house, owned by Otto Levin (1878–1933) and Ejnar Munksgaard (1890–1948). In 1927, Levin & Munksgaard reopened the department to sell used books. After Munksgaard's death in 1948, the company was continued by his heirs in partnership with employees Børge Heiring, Erik Høeg and F. Davids-Thomsen.

The book shop was sold to Jørgen Lademann in 1978. In 1989, it was sold to the employees. In connection with the sale, the name was changed to Atheneum. It closed in 2015.

Architecture
 
Nørregade 6 is a corner building, with five bays towards Nørregade and seven bays towards Dyrkøb, constructed with four storeys above a walk-out basement. The chamfered corner bay was dictated for all corner buildings by Jørgen Henrich Rawert's and Peter Meyn's guidelines for the rebuilding of the city after the fire so that the fire department's long ladder companies could navigate the streets more easily. The corner bay features two balconies supported by corbels on the first and second floors. The first floor windows of the slightly recessed central bays towards both streets are visually brought together by a through-going sill course. The first floor windows on the projecting outer bays as well towards both streets as well as the second floor corner window are topped by hood moulds. The black Mansard roof dates from a renovation in 1897. It features three dormer windows towards Nørregade, four dormer windows towards Dyrkøb and one in the corner bay.

Todau
The property is owned by APS Kbus 38 Nr 1342.

See also
 Kronprinsessegade

References

External links

 Source
 Source
 Source (Wolff)

Listed residential buildings in Copenhagen
Neoclassical architecture in Copenhagen
Residential buildings completed in 1828